The 1856 United States presidential election in Pennsylvania took place on November 4, 1856, as part of the 1856 United States presidential election. Voters chose 27 representatives, or electors to the Electoral College, who voted for president and vice president.

Pennsylvania voted for the Democratic candidate, James Buchanan, over the Republican candidate, John C. Frémont, and the Know Nothing candidate, Millard Fillmore. Buchanan, a lifelong Pennsylvanian, won his home state by a margin of 18.12%.

Following the election, Pennsylvania would establish itself as a Republican stronghold. This would be the final time that the Keystone State would vote for a Democratic candidate until Franklin D. Roosevelt won the state in 1936, as well as the final time that the Keystone State voted for a non-Republican candidate until Theodore Roosevelt’s third-party bid in 1912. To date, this marks the only time Snyder County voted for a Democratic presidential candidate.

Results

See also
 List of United States presidential elections in Pennsylvania

References

Pennsylvania
1856
1856 Pennsylvania elections